Cassius Scaevus was a centurion of Caesar's 8th legion. Scaevus fought in his battle of Dyrrachium in his fort, and when his cohorts senior centurions were injured, he took command. He fought back and drove the attacking Pompeian cohort's back to the city, despite being, in the words of Suetonius, "blinded in one eye, wounded in thigh and shoulder, and with no fewer than 120 holes in his shield." When Caesar arrived, he awarded Scaevus Primus Pilus status, was given triple his pay in denarii and was recorded to have over 200 Pompeian arrows in his scutum. Caesar was so impressed, he promoted Scaevus to his Legio X Equestris and continued to serve after the death of the tenth's Primus Pilius, Gaius Crastinus, at Pharsalus.

References 

Ancient Roman soldiers